Jerkin' or Jerk is a street dance originating from and popularized by the Inland Empire-based groups New Boyz and Audio Push, and has origins in the Inland Empire and Los Angeles. Since 2009, jerkin' gained fans along the West Coast, East Coast, and in Europe, notably France and Germany, although it was heavily derided in the Southern United States.

According to Oktane of Audio Push, jerkin' culture came from gang members dancing at parties, stating: "Jerking actually came from gang-banging. Like, it was a dance that gang members did. Like, the anti-dance. If you were in the party and everyone was dancing, [the gang members] would be doing the jerk." The dance itself consists of moving your legs in and out called the "jerk", and doing other moves such as the "reject", "dip", and "pindrop".

Music
The rap group New Boyz wrote and recorded a hit in Los Angeles entitled "You're a Jerk", while Audio Push wrote and recorded "Teach Me How To Jerk". As the jerk culture continued to flourish, several new groups specializing in the Jerk style were being courted and signed by major labels. Arista had signed to the group The Rej3ctz, and the label was seriously looking into many other jerk groups that were flourishing on the Internet.

Dance crews

Once Jerkin' went mainstream, new dance crews and artists began competing and performing at events in Southern California as well as in other parts of the world as its popularity spread. The Ranger$ crew not only competes in dance contests, winning numerous awards, but have recorded several songs and have been signed to a major label. Other notable crews in the Southern California area include Action Figure$, U.C.L.A. Jerk Kings, and the LOL Kid$z.

Fashion
People who jerk usually wear skinny jeans (varying from the unusual to the usual colors and washes), considered a rejection of the baggy pants style.  Many elements of scene and the raver are used in the jerkin' movement, such as bright colored clothing, tight pants, or novelty graphic tees.  Also, people who dance the jerk generally wear hightop or retro shoes, including Chuck Taylor and Nike hightop shoes.  Shoes may or may not be multi-colored.

References

American hip hop genres
African-American dance
Dances of the United States
Culture of Los Angeles
Hip hop dance
Street dance
West Coast hip hop
21st-century dance